Holy See–Malaysia relations (Jawi: هوبوڠن مليسيا–تختا سوچي) are foreign relations between the Holy See and Malaysia.

The current Ambassador-Designate of Malaysia to the Holy See is Mr. Hendy Assan, while the current Apostolic Nuncio to Malaysia is Archbishop Wojciech Załuski.

History
In 2002, Prime Minister Mahathir Mohamad visited the Vatican to meet Pope John Paul II. During the second visit of the next Malaysian Prime Minister, Najib Razak and Pope Benedict XVI at the Apostolic Palace in Castel Gandolfo, an agreement to establish diplomatic relations between the Holy See and Malaysia was finalised. Malaysia became the 179th state to establish diplomatic relations with the Holy See.

The Holy See previously had an apostolic delegation, based in Bangkok, for the country. Pending the appointment of the first Nuncio to Malaysia, the papal representative in Bangkok continued to act as Apostolic Delegate for Malaysia, accredited to the Catholic Church in the country but not to the Government. In January 2013, Archbishop Joseph Marino was appointed as the first nuncio to Malaysia.

In 2016, Malaysia appointed Bernard Giluk Dompok as the first resident ambassador to the Holy See. In 2017, the Holy See opens its official chancery in Kuala Lumpur.

See also 
 Foreign relations of the Holy See
 Foreign relations of Malaysia

References

External links 
 Apostolic Delegation to Malaysia
 The Pope Receives Prime Minister of Malaysia Video of meeting between Pope Benedict XVI and Prime Minister Najib Razak from Official YouTube channel of the Vatican. 18 July 2011, Retrieved 19 July 2011

 
Malaysia
Bilateral relations of Malaysia